Florence is an unincorporated community in Morgan County, Missouri, United States. It is located eight miles south of U.S. Route 50 on Missouri Route 135.

A post office called Florence has been in operation since 1839. Early variant names were "Williamsville" and "Jonesboro".

Gallery

Notable Residents
Robert F. Walker

References

Unincorporated communities in Morgan County, Missouri
Unincorporated communities in Missouri